Rüdiger Safranski (born 1 January 1945) is a German philosopher and author.

Life 

From 1965 to 1972, Safranski studied philosophy (among others, with Theodor W. Adorno), German literature, history and history of art at Goethe University in Frankfurt am Main and as well at the Free University in Berlin (then West Berlin). There, he worked as an assistant lecturer for German literature from 1972 to 1977. He earned a PhD from FU Berlin in 1976 for a dissertation by the title of "Studies on the Development of Working-Class Literature in the Federal Republic of Germany" (original ). In the late 1970s, he worked as the co-publisher and editor of the Berliner Hefte, a journal on literary life. From 1977 to 1982, Safranski worked as a lecturer in adult education. Since 1987 he has worked as a freelance writer.

In 2005 he married his longtime girlfriend Gisela Nicklaus.

He lives in Berlin and Badenweiler.

Works and TV appearances 
Safranski's most popular works are monographs on Friedrich Schiller, E.T.A. Hoffmann, Arthur Schopenhauer, Friedrich Nietzsche, Martin Heidegger, and Johann Wolfgang von Goethe.

Since 1994, he is a member of the P.E.N. Center, since 2001 member of the Deutsche Akademie für Sprache und Dichtung (German Academy for Language and Poetry) in Darmstadt.

From 2002 to 2012, he co-hosted (along with Peter Sloterdijk) a bi-monthly debate on philosophical and ethical questions, the so-called "Philosophical Quartet" (German: Philosophisches Quartett), for German public-service TV station ZDF.

List of works 
 Goethe and Schiller. Geschichte einer Freundschaft. Story of a friendship. München ua, Hanser. Munich, Hanser. 2009.  
 Romantik. Eine deutsche Affäre. Romanticism. A German affair. München ua, Hanser. Munich, Hanser. 2007.   [Review of the English translation by Omid Mehrgan in Modern Language Notes, April 2015; see also: Hans-Dieter Gelfert in The Berlin Review of Books, 30 November 2009]
 Schiller als Philosoph – Eine Anthologie. Schiller as Philosopher – An Anthology. Berlin, wjs-Verlag. Berlin, wjs-Verlag. 2005. 
 Schiller oder die Erfindung des Deutschen Idealismus. Schiller, or the invention of German idealism. München ua, Hanser. Munich, Hanser. 2004.  [Rezension: Manfred Koch in NZZ, 25.; see also: Manfred Koch in the NZZ, 25 September 2004]
 Wieviel Globalisierung verträgt der Mensch? How much globalization can a human being tolerate? München ua: Hanser. Munich: Hanser. 2003. 
 Friedrich Nietzsche. Friedrich Nietzsche. Biographie seines Denkens. Biography of his thinking. München ua, Hanser. Munich, Hanser. 2000.  [Rezension: Ijoma Mangold in Berliner Zeitung, 18.; see also: Ijoma Mangold in Berliner Zeitung, 18 August 2000]
 Das Böse oder Das Drama der Freiheit. Evil or the drama of freedom. München ua, Hanser. Munich, Hanser. 1997.  [Rezension: Micha Brumlik in Die Zeit, 19.; see also: Micha Brumlik in Die Zeit, 19 September 1997]
 Ein Meister aus Deutschland. A master from Germany. Heidegger und seine Zeit. Heidegger and his time. München ua, Hanser. Munich, Hanser. 1994. 
 Wieviel Wahrheit braucht der Mensch? How much truth do we need? Über das Denkbare und das Lebbare. About the thinkable and liveable. München ua, Hanser. Munich, Hanser. 1990. 
 Schopenhauer und die wilden Jahre der Philosophie. Schopenhauer and the wild years of philosophy. Eine Biographie. A biography. 2. 2. Aufl. München ua: Hanser. Munich et al. ed: Hanser. 1988. 
 ETA Hoffmann. ETA Hoffmann. Das Leben eines skeptischen Phantasten. The life of a skeptical dreamer. München ua: Hanser. Munich: Hanser. 1984. 
 Studien zur Entwicklung der Arbeiterliteratur in der Bundesrepublik (Dissertation), Berlin, Freie Univ., 1976. Studies on the development of working-class literature in the Federal Republic (dissertation), Berlin, Freie Univ., 1976.

Awards 
 1995 Friedrich Märker Prize for Essayists
 1996 Wilhelm Heinse Medal of the Mainz Academy of Sciences and Literature
 1998 Ernst Robert Curtius Prize for Essay Writing
 2000 Friedrich Nietzsche Prize of the State of Saxony-Anhalt
 2003 Premio Internazionale Federico Nietzsche, the Italian Nietzsche Society
 2005 Leipzig Book Fair Prize in the category Non-Fiction/Essays for "Schiller, or The Invention of German Idealism"
 2006 Friedrich-Hölderlin-Preis of the City of Bad Homburg
 2006 Welt-Literaturpreis
 2009 Corine Literature Prize, Lifetime Achievement prize from the Bavarian Minister President
 2014 Thomas Mann Prize

References 

1945 births
Living people
German philosophers
German male writers
Officers Crosses of the Order of Merit of the Federal Republic of Germany
Heidegger scholars
People from Rottweil